Youngs Peak is a  glaciated mountain summit in Glacier National Park, in the Selkirk Mountains of British Columbia, Canada. The mountain was first climbed in 1898 by Charles Ernest Fay and Redt F. Curtis. The mountain's name was officially adopted February 8, 1977, by the Geographical Names Board of Canada. It is named for Mrs. Julia M. Young (1853-1925), the Glacier House manager from 1899 through 1920.

Climate
Based on the Köppen climate classification, Youngs Peak is in a subarctic climate zone with cold, snowy winters, and mild summers. Precipitation runoff from the mountain and meltwater from its glaciers drains north into a tributary of the Illecillewaet River, and south into headwaters of the Incomappleux River. The months July through September offer the most favorable weather for viewing and climbing Youngs Peak.

See also

Geography of British Columbia

References

External links
 Weather: Youngs Peak

Two-thousanders of British Columbia
Selkirk Mountains
Glacier National Park (Canada)
Columbia Country
Kootenay Land District